Craig Marais may refer to:
 Craig Marais (cricketer)
 Craig Marais (field hockey)